Dana Batulková (born 16 March 1958 in Prague) is a Czech actress.

Selected filmography

Films 
 Vrať se do hrobu! (1989) 
 Proč pláčeš, břízo bílá (1991) TV
 Trampoty pana Humbla (1997) TV
 Záhadná paní Savageová (1997) TV
 Nezvěstný (2003) TV
 Benátky (2010)

TV series 
 Četnické humoresky (2000, 2007)
 Horákovi (2006 - 2007)
 Comeback (2008 - 2011)
 Gympl s (r)učením omezeným (2013)
 Ohnivý kuře (2016)

References

External links
 
 Biography on csfd.cz

1958 births
Living people
Czech film actresses
21st-century Czech actresses
Czech stage actresses
Czech television actresses
20th-century Czech actresses
Academy of Performing Arts in Prague alumni
Actresses from Prague